A Cup of Day is the debut album of Japanese J-pop band Ramjet Pulley. It was released on September 27, 2001, under the Giza Studio label.

Background
The album consists of four previously released singles, such as Hello Goodbye, Overjoyed, Destiny ~21 Another One~ and Final Way.

Their third single Destiny ~21 Another One~ is an alternative version of their song Destiny which was included in debut single Hello..goodbye as a coupling song.

Overjoyed is a Japanese cover of the famous song by Stevie Wonder which includes completely new melody and translated lyrics into Japanese. This song along with their fourth single Final Way were included in the compilation album Giza Studio Masterpiece Blend 2001.

Yes...no is a coupling song from their second single.

Three songs out of fourteen are only instrumental by Satoru Kobayashi.

Charting
The album charted at No. 100 on Oricon in its first week. It charted for one week and sold more than 3,290+ copies.

Track listing

Personnel
Credits adapted from the CD booklet of A cup of day.

Akiko Matsuda - vocals
Satomi Makoshi - songwriting
Kazunobu Mashima - composing
Satoru Kobayashi - arranging
Ryoichi Terashima - acoustic guitar
Masaharu Ishikawa - drums
Kouichi Osamu - wood bass
Takashi Masuzaki (Dimension) - guitar
Akira Onozuka (Dimension) - piano
Kazuki Katsuta (Dimejsion) - tenor sax

Taku Oyabu - recording, mixing
Hiroyuki Kubota - recording
Satoshi Fukuda - assistant engineering
Akio Nakajima - mixing
Masahiro Shimada - mastering
Toshiyuki Ebihara - A&R
Shinichi Takgagi - public relations
Emi Akuzawa - public relations
Noriko Ohgami – art direction
Kanonji - producing

Cover
The coupling song Destiny was later covered and performed by Japanese singersongwriter Miki Matsuhashi, the song was used as opening theme for Anime television series Detective Conan, in credits Satomi and Kazunobu are mentioned as well. Re-arranged version of "Destiny" appears in duet single Nanatsu no Umi wo Wataru Kaze no you ni  by U-ka Saegusa in db and Rina Aiuchi.
The debut single Hello...Goodbye was covered by various Japanese idol groups such as Momoiro Clover Z which was included in compilation album Iriguchi no Nai Deguchi; Majestic 7 and Launchers.

In media
Good-bye Yesterday: ending theme for Nihon TV/Yomiuri TV program Wake up!

References 

2001 debut albums
Being Inc. albums
Giza Studio albums
Japanese-language albums